Anjirak (also Romanized as Anjīrak) is a village in Shamsabad Rural District, in the Central District of Dezful County, Khuzestan Province, Iran. At the 2006 census, its population was 3,704, in 700 families.

References 

Populated places in Dezful County